Frederick Llewellyn Wood (July 21, 1865 – November 17, 1935) was a Canadian professional baseball player. He played parts of two seasons in Major League Baseball in 1884–85.

Wood played in 12 games for the Detroit Wolverines of the National League in 1884, splitting his fielding time between catcher and right field.  In 42 at bats, he gathered just two hits for a .048 batting average, scored four runs, and had three bases on balls. In 1885, he played one game for the Buffalo Bisons, also of the National League, and produced one hit in four at bats.

Wood's brother, Pete Wood, was also a major league player, and his teammate with the Bisons.

References

External links

1865 births
1935 deaths
19th-century baseball players
Baseball players from Hamilton, Ontario
Buffalo Bisons (minor league) players
Buffalo Bisons (NL) players
Canadian expatriate baseball players in the United States
Detroit Wolverines players
Toronto (minor league baseball) players
Hamilton Primrose players
Hamilton Clippers players
London Tecumsehs (baseball) players
Major League Baseball catchers
Major League Baseball players from Canada
Major League Baseball right fielders
People from Dundas, Ontario